In humans, a single transverse palmar crease is a single crease that extends across the palm of the hand, formed by the fusion of the two palmar creases (known in palmistry as the "heart line" and the "head line"). Although it is found more frequently in persons with several abnormal medical conditions, it is not predictive of any of these conditions since it is also found in perfectly healthy persons. It is found in 1.5% of the world population in at least one hand.

Former name
Because it resembles the usual condition of non-human simians, it was, in the past, called the simian crease or simian line. These terms have widely fallen out of favor due to their pejorative connotation.

Medical significance
The presence of a single transverse palmar crease has no medical significance. It is found in 1.5% of all people, and though it is found at a higher frequency in people with abnormal medical conditions, in every one of these conditions many people do not have a single transverse palmer crease, thus it has low predictive value.

Males are twice as likely as females to have this characteristic, and it tends to run in families. In its non-symptomatic form, it is more common among Asians and Native Americans than among other populations, and in some families there is a tendency to inherit the condition unilaterally; that is, on one hand only.

While it is often found in people with Down Syndrome, many who have this syndrome do not have this crease, and thus is not a diagnostic indicator of the Down Syndrome. 

The presence of a single transverse palmar has been associated with a number of abnormal medical conditions — that is, it is found at a higher than 1.5% frequency, but in all of these conditions many do not have this crease. Examples of conditions with such an association are fetal alcohol syndrome, and with the genetic chromosomal abnormalities  Down syndrome (chromosome 21), cri du chat syndrome (chromosome 5), Klinefelter syndrome, Wolf-Hirschhorn Syndrome, Noonan syndrome (chromosome 12), Patau syndrome (chromosome 13), IDIC 15/Dup15q (chromosome 15), Edward's syndrome (chromosome 18), and Aarskog-Scott syndrome (X-linked recessive), or autosomal recessive disorder, such as Leukocyte adhesion deficiency-2 (LAD2). A unilateral single palmar crease was also reported in a case of chromosome 9 mutation causing Nevoid basal cell carcinoma syndrome and Robinow syndrome. It is also sometimes found on the hand of the affected side of patients with Poland syndrome, and craniosynostosis.

A 1971 study refutes the hypothesis that the phenomenon is caused by fetal hand movement: the appearance of the crease occurs around the second month of gestation, before the digital movement phase in the womb begins.

See also
 Dermatoglyphics

References

External links 

Hand
Down syndrome